Sintoria is a genus of robber flies (insects in the family Asilidae). There are about six described species in Sintoria.

Species
These six species belong to the genus Sintoria:
 Sintoria cazieri Wilcox, 1972 i c g
 Sintoria cyanea Wilcox, 1972 i c g b
 Sintoria emeralda Hull, 1962 c g
 Sintoria lagunae Wilcox, 1972 c g
 Sintoria pappi Wilcox, 1972 i c g b
 Sintoria rossi Wilcox, 1972 c g
Data sources: i = ITIS, c = Catalogue of Life, g = GBIF, b = Bugguide.net

References

Further reading

 
 
 

Asilidae genera
Articles created by Qbugbot